Cabela's Big Game Hunter is a hunting video game series published by HeadGames Publishing, Inc and Activision from 1998 to 2014, named after retailer Cabela's.

Games

Cabela's Big Game Hunter (1998)

Cabela's Big Game Hunter II (1998)

Cabela's Big Game Hunter III (1999)

Cabela's Big Game Hunter 4 (2000)

Cabela's Big Game Hunter 5: Platinum Series (2001)

Cabela's Big Game Hunter: Ultimate Challenge (2001)

Cabela's Big Game Hunter 6 (2002)

Cabela's Big Game Hunter: 2004 Season (2003)

Cabela's Big Game Hunter 2005 Adventures (2004)

Cabela's Big Game Hunter 2006 Trophy Season (2005)

Cabela's Alaskan Adventures (2006)

Cabela's Big Game Hunter (2007)

Cabela's Big Game Hunter was developed by Sand Grain Studios, Fun Labs and Magic Wand Productions for the PlayStation 2, Wii and Xbox 360. It released on November 6, 2007.

Big Game Hunter has the players venturing to different lands and meeting the hunting ranger in each. From there, the player can either play a mini-game of shooting smaller animals or flying birds, hunting medium-sized game, and going after the trophy animal It features the hunting areas of Montana, British Columbia, Zambia, Argentina, Ethiopia, and New Zealand. The gameplay relies on hunting tags for each animal in the game. After shooting the animal(s) the players has a tag for, the adrenaline meter goes up. When it becomes full, everything except the player stops moving.

Cabela's Big Game Hunter 2010 (2009)

Cabela's Big Game Hunter 2010 was developed by Cauldron and published by Activision for the PlayStation 3, Wii and Xbox 360. It was released on September 29, 2009.

The player takes control of a marksman named Jack Wilde, who is trying to become a member of a hunting club The Royal Ancient Order of Orion. There are 12 story levels, with Order of Orion via radio, placed in territories across the world like mountains of Canada, New Zealand, the deserts of Argentina, and others. The goal is to find and hunt various animals (with Wilde's hunting senses), as a requirement to be accepted in the club. Falling off ledges or logs, or stepping on noisy terrain could cause failure in the hunt. Aggressive animals, such as bear or mountain lion, will attack the player.

Cabela's Big Game Hunter 2012 (2011)

Cabela's Big Game Hunter: Pro Hunts (2014)

References

Cabela's video games
Video game franchises introduced in 1998
Action-adventure games
Windows games
GameCube games
Game Boy Advance games
PlayStation 2 games
PlayStation 3 games
Wii games
Wii U games
Xbox games
Xbox 360 games
Video games developed in Slovakia
Video games developed in Romania
Video games developed in the United States
Video games set in Africa
Video games set in North America
Video games set in South America
Former disambiguation pages converted to set index articles